Kraissl's lines are a set of anatomical skin lines. They differ from Langer's lines in that unlike Langer's lines, which are defined in term of collagen orientation, Kraissl's lines are the lines of maximum skin tension.

Whereas Langer's lines were defined in cadavers, Kraissl's lines have been defined in living individuals. Also, the method used to identify Kraissl's lines is not traumatic.

See also 
 Blaschko's lines
 Langer's lines

References 

Skin lines